Neodorcadion virleti is a species of beetle in the family Cerambycidae. It was described by Brullé in 1833, originally under the genus Dorcadion. It is known from Greece.

Varietas
 Neodorcadion virleti var. acarnanicum Pic, 1914
 Neodorcadion virleti var. subbinotatum Pic, 1914

References

Dorcadiini
Beetles described in 1833